The 33rd Sarasaviya Awards festival (Sinhala: 33වැනි සරසවිය සම්මාන උලෙළ), presented by the Associated Newspapers of Ceylon Limited, was held to honor the best films of 2015 Sinhala cinema on December 15, 2016, at the Nelum Pokuna Mahinda Rajapaksa Theatre, Colombo 07, Sri Lanka at 6:00 p.m. The ceremony was hosted by Kamal Addararachchi and Sangeetha Weeraratne. Prime Minister Ranil Wickramasinghe was the chief guest at the awards nights.

Maharaja Gemunu won the most awards with eleven including Best Film. Other winners included Oba Nathuwa Oba Ekka and Ho Gaana Pokuna with three awards.

Awards

References

Sarasaviya Awards
Sarasaviya